Sierra Leone assumed its present large geographical size only in 1896. Prior to that, it was only a small colony encompassing roughly the 30-km-long peninsula on which Freetown is located. Initially, the British and Creoles (freed African American and Afro-Caribbean slaves and their descendants) of the Freetown colony had only a very limited involvement in the affairs of the African kingdoms around them; such as it was, it consisted mostly of trading and missionary activity. Over the course of the 19th century this involvement gradually increased. The colonial government was, in particular, interested in fostering trade as this provided it with its main source of revenue, in the form of customs duties and other taxes. This inevitably drew it into engagement with the African kingdoms, mainly by making treaties with the kingdoms or sending military expeditions against them.

The treaties usually committed an African chief to protect merchants and maintain peaceful relations with his neighbours so that trade would not be disturbed; in return, the British would pay him a gift or annual stipend. The military expeditions were against chiefs who acted detrimentally to the colony's business interests by evicting traders, restricting trade, or warring with neighbours. After the Slave Trade Act 1807 abolishing slavery, the government also began pressing the chiefs, by treaty or force, to refrain from the slave trade. Since the wars between the chiefdoms were mostly slave-procuring wars, or otherwise intimately connected with the slave trade, suppression of the slave trade and promotion of "legitimate" trade in other products were both key to reducing wars between chief.

In addition to commercial and anti-slave-trade motives for the British incursions into the Sierra Leone hinterland, military officers posted to Sierra Leone needed battle victories to enhance their reputations; and British felt culturally superiority and assumed that Europeanising natives was a proper and upright activity.

List of interventions
This article lists some of the interventions into the Sierra Leone hinterland in the 19th century.

Protectorate
In August 1896, the British declared the entire hinterland area a "Protectorate" and placed it under their administration. In 1898, the Sierra Leone chiefs sought to free themselves of British control in a rebellion called the Hut Tax war.  It was the last large armed confrontation between British and Africans in Sierra Leone. The Africans' defeat ushered in the country's modern colonial period, which lasted until political independence in 1961.

Sources
Arthur Abraham, Mende Government and Politics Under Colonial Rule. Freetown, 1978.

Christopher Fyfe, History of Sierra Leone. London, 1962. (Oxford University Press)

Kenneth Little, The Mende of Sierra Leone. London, 1967. (First ed. was 1951.)

Notes

19th century in Sierra Leone
Sierra Leone Creole history
British West Africa
Sierra Leone–United Kingdom relations
19th century in the British Empire
19th century in Africa
Sierra Leone Colony and Protectorate
Wars involving Sierra Leone